Lake Creek is a  long 3rd order tributary to Sugar Creek in Crawford and Venango County, Pennsylvania.

Course
Lake Creek rises on the Woodcock Creek divide about 2 miles northwest of Guys Mills, Pennsylvania in Crawford County.  Lake Creek then flows southeasterly into Venango County to meet Sugar Creek at Cooperstown, Pennsylvania.

Watershed
Lake Creek drains  of area, receives about 44.6 in/year of precipitation, has a topographic wetness index of 466.17, and has an average water temperature of 7.88 °C.  The watershed is 66% forested.

See also 
 List of rivers of Pennsylvania
 List of tributaries of the Allegheny River

References

Additional Maps

Rivers of Crawford County, Pennsylvania
Rivers of Venango County, Pennsylvania
Rivers of Pennsylvania
Tributaries of the Allegheny River